Camp Lazlo is an American animated television series created by Joe Murray for Cartoon Network. The series follows Lazlo, an anthropomorphic spider monkey that goes to a camp called "Camp Kidney", a Boy Scout-like summer camp in Pimpleback Mountains. Lazlo resides in the "Jelly Bean" cabin with his fellow Bean Scouts; Raj, an Indian elephant, and Clam, a pygmy rhinoceros. Lazlo is often at odds with his pessimistic camp leader, Scoutmaster Lumpus, but usually gets along well with the second-in-command, Slinkman and other campers. Camp Kidney sits just across the lake from Acorn Flats, which is home to the campsite of the all-female Squirrel Scouts (which functions somewhat similarly to the Girl Scouts). Camp Lazlo was one of the first Cartoon Network Studios series produced in a widescreen aspect ratio of 16:9, despite originally being broadcast in the full screen aspect ratio of 4:3.

Camp Lazlo was produced by Cartoon Network Studios. Its style of humor is similar to the Nickelodeon series Rocko's Modern Life, which Murray also created and worked on. The series premiered on Cartoon Network on July 8, 2005, and ran for five seasons comprising 61 episodes and the hour-long television special, Where's Lazlo?. The final episode aired on March 27, 2008. During its run, the series won three Primetime Emmy Awards and three Pulcinella Awards, and was nominated for another Emmy and an Annie Award. Spin-off media include DVDs, restaurant promotions, a video game, and digital download releases.

Premise

Plot and characters

The series is set in a universe inhabited solely by anthropomorphic animals of many species and focuses on a trio of campers attending a poorly run summer camp known as Camp Kidney. The trio consists of Lazlo, the eccentric, optimistic spider monkey; Raj, the timid Indian elephant; and Clam, the quiet albino pygmy rhinoceros, and their multiple surreal misadventures.

Other characters include the selfish, ill-tempered moose Scoutmaster Lumpus and his mild-mannered assistant Slinkman the banana slug, the boys' assortment of fellow campers including the disgruntled, surly platypus Edward, the two unintelligent, dirt-loving dung beetles Chip and Skip, and the klutzy, accident-prone, geeky Guinea pig Samson. There's also a rival summer camp called Acorn Flats, which is attended solely by girls, primarily focusing on Lazlo, Raj, and Clam's respective female counterparts attending that camp; Patsy the adventurous mongoose who has a major crush on Lazlo, Gretchen the short-tempered alligator, Nurse Leslie the pink nurse shark who is a doctor and Nina the bookish, sci-fi-loving giraffe, along with the object of Scoutmaster Lumpus's affections, Miss Doe (a female deer), the head of Acorn Flats.

Murray said that, as he did in Rocko's Modern Life, he matched the personalities of characters to various animals.

Some episodes may involve the Bean Scouts' attempts at unveiling the truth behind camp legends or clowning around, infuriating their peers or placing themselves in a variety of odd situations commonly based around traditional or fictionalized, bizarre camp activities.

Setting
The setting of the show was designed to deliberately bring a nostalgic feeling of childhood summer camps and "evoke a comfortable place to visit". The colors instill the feeling of summer camp, rather than basing color schemes on real-life colors; Murray and Sue Mondt, the art director, chose the colors. In Camp Lazlo, the sky can be yellow, and trees are not always green and brown. For the architecture and objects, books with cabins, camps and Native American artifacts were consulted. Ultimately, Murray wanted to create a place where nature prevails, and the hustle and bustle of real-life is left behind, with no technology to distract from the impressions of camp life. He describes the camp as having a "retro" feel. Murray likes 1950s and early 1960s designs of objects like advertising art, lamps, and old vacation brochures, and he said that the "brushy quality that developed at that time" heavily influenced the setting.
 Camp Kidney, set in the Pimpleback Mountains next to Leaky Lake, is the camp where most of the show takes place. This is a summer camp attended by a group of boy scout-like campers called The Bean Scouts. In keeping the theme of the name of the camp, the campers are allowed to name their cabins after various types of beans: Jelly Cabin, Pinto Cabin, Fava Cabin, and so on. The camp is known for a low standard of quality and has been threatened with closure more than once. The camp is led by Scoutmaster Lumpus, with most of the administrative details assigned to his assistant, Mr. Slinkman. A full staff complements the camp, including a nurse and a chef.
 Acorn Flats is across the lake from Camp Kidney, attended by girls of similar age, called the Squirrel Scouts. Acorn Flats has higher quality facilities than Camp Kidney, a point of contention between the two respective camps, with Acorn Flats being the more dominant in the rivalry. The leader of the Squirrel Scouts is Jane Doe, and her grumpy assistant, Ms. Rubella Mucus-(a warthog). Both Camp Kidney and Acorn Flats are part of a larger hierarchical organization, under the direct command of Commander Hoo-ha, with "The Big Bean" as the head of all scout chapters, which includes Beans and Squirrels and (possibly) Tomato Scouts.
 Prickly Pines is a town near both camps with full commercial facilities: a post office, several restaurants, a laundromat, and other sundry stores.

Episodes

Production

Development
After Rocko's Modern Life concluded production in 1996, series creator Joe Murray kept a notebook of ideas for television shows and books. Murray attributes some of his most fond memories to days at summer camp; Murray said that he attended summer camp every summer for "4 or 5 years in a row" and that he "couldn't really get the scouting thing down". He also described cartoons with pastoral settings, such as the Bugs Bunny cartoons of the Looney Tunes and Merrie Melodies series and Yogi Bear, as having a "calming" effect due to the tree-filled backgrounds. At the time he believed that too many futuristic themes appeared in media and literature, so he wished to create a series that would "get back to nature".

Camp Lazlo originated from a camp-related children's book series concept by Murray that, according to him, "outgrew its medium". As Murray developed the concept, he felt that his "lunatic characters wanted to live" and decided that a simple story could not sufficiently house his characters. Murray desired to create a series about a group of children without "high tech stimulus" and "in nature".

Linda Simensky, who had previously worked with Murray on Rocko, had since moved to Cartoon Network and called Murray to solicit a new series. After an initial hesitation, Murray sent Simensky the idea for a show with a working title of 3 Beans. Simensky "thought it sounded too much like a salad", so Murray changed the name to Camp Lazlo. When approval was given, Murray decided to produce the show at Cartoon Network Studios and his studio Joe Murray Productions, and brought Mark O'Hare on as co-producer.

According to Murray, the greenlight to produce Lazlo had been initially given and later revoked, leaving Murray and Mark O'Hare "pissed" and "depressed". Murray believed that an executive was not "completely sold" by the series, and worked to have the series receive definite approval. Production of Camp Lazlo began in 2004 and ended in 2007; November 2007 saw the beginning of the series' final production run. The series would later have writers that would go on to create their own shows, such as Thurop Van Orman, who later created The Marvelous Misadventures of Flapjack in 2008, and J. G. Quintel, who later created Regular Show in 2010 and Close Enough in 2020.

Writing

Murray felt that Camp Lazlo successfully appealed to younger children because his prior experiences with his own children helped him determine details that children found humorous. Murray said that he resisted the urge inside of him to micromanage the production and instead approved aspects and contributions related to the show. He said that he had "a lot of pre-production time" and therefore details became established before the show aired on television. His main philosophies expressed in the show include the phrase "be who you are" and that one should question authority unless the issue is "a safety issue." Murray said that he avoids sending "messages" to children and that he hoped that his television show did not contain "too many messages."

Murray asked many staff members who participated in creating Rocko's Modern Life to return and perform duties for Camp Lazlo, describing his main tactic to attract the crew as "coercion". Murray wanted the Rocko's Modern Life crew as it "knows my sensibilities" and gained ten years of experience. Crew members of Rocko's Modern Life, such as Robert Scull or Peter Burns, have worked on this show. For season one, Murray hired among others comedy writer Martin Olson, who had collaborated with Murray on some of the most successful stories for Rocko's Modern Life.

Animation
Murray said that he likes storybook art and the works of Pablo Picasso and Henri Matisse; the styles influenced the visual style of Camp Lazlo. He also describes "great comic book artists" as important to himself and Mark O'Hare. The team created some backgrounds using "Acryl Gouache," a mixture of acrylic paint and gouache. Rough Draft Studios, a South Korean studio, produced the Camp Lazlo footage.

Voice acting
Murray asked Tom Kenny to voice characters because Murray felt that Kenny "adds writing to his roles" and "brings so much." Murray looked for "comedic timing" in his voice actors, and therefore he used many stand-up comics and sketch actors. Carlos Alazraqui, who voiced Rocko from Rocko's Modern Life, voices Lazlo. Mr. Lawrence, who voiced Filburt, voices Edward and the Loons.

Music
The opening theme song, "Lazlo Was His Name-O", was based on the children's folk song "Bingo", which was adapted, with new lyrics, by American musician Terry Scott Taylor. The music score for the show was composed by Andy Paley, and features original camp songs, bluegrass and cowboy swing. Joe Murray explained that the team often used "strange instruments" such as washboards, and the musical saw. In addition to Paley's music score, the show also utilized many tracks from the APM Music library.

Reception
Ray Richmond of The Hollywood Reporter posted his review of the series on July 7, 2005. Richmond said that his child enjoyed the show but did not ask to see it again. Richmond said that the show forms "plenty lively and a nice, safe way for a child viewer to spend a half-hour". Richmond said that the show has too much "self-consciously precious" humor; the reviewer said that the trait may not factor for children and described children as "demanding and non-discriminating at the same time."

Ginia Bellafante of The New York Times said that if she became "socio-analytical about the Lazlo enterprise," Camp Kidney appears to be a stand-in for "our culture of obsessive parenting."

Kathie Huddleston, a reporter for the Science Fiction Weekly, created a favorable review of Camp Lazlo.

The Atlanta Journal-Constitution reviewed the series and gave it an "A."

Joly Herman of Common Sense Media posted a review of the show on Go.com. Herman describes the humor used in the Camp Lazlo as making it an "unpredictable show for younger viewers." Herman gave the show two stars out of five.

Awards and nominations

Other media

Digital releases
Camp Lazlo was released in HD remasters partially on Boomerang's streaming service in 2018, completing the HD release of the show in its entirety in June 2019. The complete series was also released on HBO Max in Latin America.

DVD releases
Prior to Camp Lazlos premiere on Cartoon Network, a Press Kit for the show was given away as a promotional item, containing fact sheets on the show and a DVD with four episodes (2 half-hour episodes): "Gone Fishin' (Sort of) / Beans Are from Mars" and "Parasitic Pal / It's No Picnic". This item is now only available through a second-hand market.

On July 18, 2007, Madman Entertainment of Australia released a set of two DVDs encoded for Region 4 of season one episodes. No further information is available about a Region 1 release or additional seasons.

Two episodes have also appeared on Cartoon Network-themed DVDs. "Hello Dolly" appeared on the Cartoon Network Fridays – Volume 1 DVD, released on September 19, 2006. "Snow Beans", a winter-themed episode of the show, was released on the Cartoon Network Christmas: Volume Three DVD on October 3, 2006.

Video game
A video game for the Nintendo Game Boy Advance called Camp Lazlo: Leaky Lake Games was released on November 6, 2006, as a tie-in to the show. The game is published by Crave Entertainment and developed by Collision Studios. The player plays as the three main characters (Lazlo, Clam and Raj) to compete in a series of game challenges and earn merit badges in the Leaky Lake Games event. That will allow them to compete against the Squirrel Scouts in a final tournament. In the game, the player meets characters, such as Scoutmaster Lumpus, Mr. Slinkman, Edward, and others to receive hints and directions in achieving goals and completing timed mini-games.

McDonald's
Camp Lazlo characters appeared in a 2007 commercial for the international fast food restaurant chain McDonald's, which advertised various Cartoon Network characters being included as action figure toys in Happy Meals, including those from Camp Lazlo. Murray did not want the series to be used in Happy Meals; the only action he could take was refusing to appear in the television commercials. Murray stated on his website that he will not explain his opposition to Happy Meals due to his respect for the effort placed by Cartoon Network "marketing people". Murray stated that his opinions are his alone and do not reflect the opinions of Cartoon Network. He said that he appreciates Cartoon Network's "campaign for healthier eating habits for kids". "C" Raggio, a character designer, appeared in the commercials instead.

In other series
Lazlo, Clam and Raj made cameo appearances during the end credits of the Codename: Kids Next Door and The Grim Adventures of Billy & Mandy crossover episode "The Grim Adventures of the KND", mixed with the characters of Evil Con Carne. Lazlo made a cameo in the MAD episode "Taking Nemo / Once Upon a Toon", as one of the cartoon characters who forgotten their identity. Lumpus and Edward briefly appeared in the Villainous episode "The Lost Cases of Elmore". Lazlo made a cameo in the OK K.O.! Let's Be Heroes episode "Crossover Nexus", as one of the cartoon characters who turned into stones by Strike.

References

Further reading
 Television Review: Camp Lazlo | Entertainment | Disney Family.com
 Common Sense Media: Camp Lazlo - Television Review

External links

 
 
 Camp Lazlo: Series Info

 
2005 American television series debuts
2008 American television series endings
2000s American animated television series
American children's animated comedy television series
Animated television series about monkeys
Animated television series about elephants
Television series about deer and moose
Television series about summer camps
Television series by Rough Draft Studios
Cartoon Network original programming
Television series by Cartoon Network Studios
English-language television shows
Emmy Award-winning programs
Television series created by Joe Murray